Katowice Wojciech Korfanty Airport  is an international airport, located in Pyrzowice,  north of Katowice, Poland. The airport has the 4th-biggest annual passenger flow in Poland.It is also the second biggest airport in the country in terms of cargo traffic.

It operates a variety of charter, regular and cargo flights. Long-haul flights are operated from Katowice to Varadero in Cuba, Bangkok and Phuket in Thailand, Cancún in Mexico, Malé in Maldives and to Puerto Plata as well as Punta Cana in Dominican Republic by LOT's Boeing 787s Dreamliner. The airport has the tallest Air Traffic Control Tower and the second longest runway in Poland. Katowice Airport is the Poland's only airport with more than one passenger terminal and the airport with the biggest number of based airlines. The Katowice Airport serves the most industrialised region in Poland, one of the most urbanised areas of Europe.

13 million inhabitants are estimated to live within 100 km of Katowice Airport. This is a larger catchment area than many airports in Europe.

History

Early years
The current location of Katowice Airport was initially used by German soldiers. In 1940, the Luftwaffe began construction of an airbase in the meadows around Pyrzowice. The Germans built three stone and concrete airstrips, with runway lengths varying from 1,000 to 1,500 meters, all of which around 50 meters wide. The airbase was used for handling of military aircraft flying from the inner part of the German Reich, carrying supplies to troops on the Eastern Front.

In the final phase of World War II, the Messerschmitt Me 163 Komet rocket-powered aircraft were tested here. Following General Ernst Udet's (a Luftwaffe flying ace) death in 1941, the airfield was named Udetfeld.

From 1945 to 1951, Soviet soldiers were stationed at the airbase. In the early 1950s, the Soviets handed the airbase over to the Polish Air Force. It was then used by the 39th Fighter Regiment, created on 17 April 1951.

A new runway was built in 1964. Soon after, the airbase Pyrzowice became host to its first-ever regular passenger traffic, when on 6 October 1966, the first plane of LOT Polish Airlines took off for Warsaw. By the end of 1969, a small passenger terminal was built (550 m2), together with a taxiway and an apron.

This runway has since been replaced by a new adjacent one (3,200m), completed in May 2015.

Development since the 1990s
In 1991, Górnośląskie Towarzystwo Lotnicze (GTL) (English: Upper Silesian Aviation Group) was created. On 27 March 1993, the German carrier Lufthansa flew to Frankfurt Airport, thus inaugurating the first international service.

Passenger Terminal B officially opened in 2007, followed by (arrivals only) Terminal C, in 2015.

Future plans include the construction of a completely new passenger terminal, a further expansion of the recently built cargo terminal, and a new railway connection.

On 3 October 2018, the airport celebrated 4 million passengers travelling through Katowice in a single year.

Facilities

Terminals
The airport features three passenger terminals A, B (departures) and C (arrivals) as well as a cargo terminal. Operations at terminal B, much bigger than A, started on 30 July 2007. Terminals are capable of handling about 8.0 million passengers annually. Terminal A handles all non-Schengen departure flights, while Terminal B handles all Schengen departure flights. The operation of the newest Terminal C building (arrivals) started on 27 June 2015. This terminal handles all arrival flights from non-Schengen and Schengen zones. Terminal B (departures to Schengen area) is under renovation (2019-2021) and is going to become one of the most modern terminals in Europe. The longest airport observation deck in Europe was able to be found inside the previous version of Terminal B. Terminal Cargo is located at the east of the airport and is one of the newest cargo terminals in the World. New passenger Terminal D is under planning such as new Cargo Terminal and Cargo City. New Terminal D will be equipped with jetways etc. There is a chance for Kiss&fly zone and VIP Terminal in the future.

Runway and apron
The airport's concrete runway is 3200m by 45m, oriented 8 and 26, and can accommodate aircraft as large as Boeing 747 or Boeing 777, albeit not at MTOW. Heavy transports such as Antonov An-124 or An-225 have been noted to land there on occasions. The airport uses new generation Instrument Landing System, a Thales 420 system. The runway at Katowice Airport is the second longest runway in Poland, behind Warsaw Chopin's runway 15/33. 33 new aircraft stands are under construction as of now. They will be located between taxiways E (Echo) and H (Hotel), to the west from main apron, between main and cargo apron and to the east from cargo apron.

The airport has two plane spotter stands, one at the western end of the airport's runway. The platforms are free to access.

Air traffic control tower
The new ATC tower has been already built. It is the tallest ATC in Poland and in Eastern Europe, at 46 meters height.

Hotel
A "Moxy by Marriott" hotel has been built recently, and is now ready to accept guests. It is located right next to the main parking entrance (P1), very close to the terminals. A direct bridge connection to the terminals is also planned.

Car parks
There are three main car parks at Katowice International Airport. P1, P2 and P3. P1 is the nearest parking connected direct with terminals. P2 is located to the east to P1. P3 is next to P2 and it is a guarded car park. There is a lot of private car parks next to the airport. The airport offers 3922 own parking spaces. There is also Premium Parking at Katowice International Airport. P1 will be expanded to 1842 parking spaces by January 2019. It will be expanded to the west.

Maintenance
At the airport are two main active maintenance buildings. The first serves mainly Wizz Air's aircraft, and the modern one belongs to Linetech and serving all other airlines. The second building is serving mainly Embraer's aircraft from all over the World.
Wizz Air's new maintenance hangar is under construction and is going to be ready in the end of 2021. The building will be operated only by Wizz Air and will be serving Airbus A321neo aircraft.
Due to the great conditions of the airport (long runway, huge three airport aprons, many stands), Katowice Airport is home to 9 based airlines. This is the biggest number of based airlines in East-Central Europe.

Airlines and destinations

Passenger

The following airlines operate regular scheduled and charter flights to and from Katowice:

Cargo

Statistics

Passenger figures

The most frequent scheduled routes

The busiest routes

Ground transportation

By car
The airport is accessible to/from Katowice and other cities of the region like Częstochowa, Kraków, Opole, Gliwice, Kielce, Oświęcim, Tychy via Expressway S1, national road 86, A4 motorway, national road 94, national road 78 and A1 motorway. The airport is also served by taxis, Uber and iTaxi. The airport offers 3,922 parking spaces. There is also premium parking at Katowice International Airport. Car rentals are available.

By bus
 MetropoliaZTM is public transport operator in this area. It operates lines to nearby cities. AP is direct bus to Katowice, it stops only at few stops in Katowice (45min to main railway station). M11 is slower bus to Katowice (70min) via Sączów, Wojkowice, Siemianowice Śląskie. M14 to Gliwice via Tarnowskie Góry. M19 to Sosnowiec via Będzin. M116/M16 is direct bus to Gliwice via Piekary Śląskie, Bytom and Zabrze (note: it changes number in Piekary Śląskie). One way ticket is 6,60PLN (for 90min with unlimited changes or for the whole route of your bus). If your destination is closer cheaper ticket for 40min costs 5,60PLN. You can also buy tickets using some mobile apps, it gives you small reduction (e.g. 6PLN instead of 6,60PLN). There is also group ticket for 5 people for 13PLN (for 90min with changes or for the whole route of the bus). Ticket for one day is 12PLN (valid until midnight). 
There is also ticket for 24hrs for 24PLN, this ticket also allow you to travel in regional (commuter) trains in the area.
Flixbus connects Katowice International Airport with Katowice, Kraków, Częstochowa, Chorzów or Bytom.
 Matuszek bus corporation connects Katowice Airport with Katowice city centre and Kraków city centre.
P-Air PyrzowiceEkspres.pl (official WizzAir's carrier) connects the airport with Kraków and Częstochowa.
Leo Express connects the airport with Ostrava, Rybnik, Gliwice and Bohumín direct from the airport.
Bus connections from other largest cities of the region, such as Kraków, Częstochowa and minibus - inter alia from/to Opole, Wrocław are also available. Local buses connect to the city of Bytom where one can change for bus to Katowice.

Bus stops are next to Terminal C and Terminal B. They are about 10 metres from the terminal entrance.

By rail
There is currently no passenger rail link to the airport, although construction of a new railway connection has begun recently, in 2021. There will be new railway routes from Siewierz and Tarnowskie Góry to Katowice International Airport. Both of the two connections currently being built will allow for either direct, or indirect passenger traffic between Katowice main railway station and the adjacent cities of the GZM (Silesian urban area) and serve the airport's passengers on a daily basis.

Accidents and incidents
 On 27 October 2007, a Boeing 737-800 chartered by the UN destroyed dozens of approach and landing lights whilst making a low approach. No passengers were injured, but the approach lights were out of service for three weeks.
 On 12 March 2013, Travel Service Flight 7137, a Boeing 737, overran the runway while landing in snowy weather just before 19:00, its nose wheel getting stuck approximately 3 feet deep into the soft ground 20 metres beyond the runway. None of the 176 passengers and 6 crew suffered any injuries, but the airport was closed until 17:00 the next day until the aircraft was recovered and taxied away.
 On 5 July 2014 Lufthansa Flight 1360, operated by Lufthansa Cityline landed on the new runway, then under construction. No passengers ended up injured, and the aircraft later made a technical flight to land on the original runway, as the new runway still had not been joined by taxiways to the taxiway system.

See also
 Katowice-Muchowiec GA Airport
 Katowice
 Silesian Voivodeship
 Katowice urban area
 List of airports in Poland

References

External links

 Official website 
 Service Platform for the Katowice Airport passengers, co-financed by the European Union 
 
 

Airports in Poland
Buildings and structures in Katowice
Transport in Katowice